The Heretick is a satirical magazine published by students of Marlborough College; it was founded by the English poet John Betjeman in 1924. The magazine is published twice a year. Focusing on satire on both local and national events, its editors have included Anthony Blunt, Jack Whitehall, Al Gordon, Lara Prendergast, Georgina Kay, James Lloyd, Catherine Brydges, Catherine Okell, Jamie Batchelor and Hamish Woodhouse. Its motto is "Upon Philistia will I triumph".

References

1924 establishments in the United Kingdom
Biannual magazines published in the United Kingdom
Student magazines published in the United Kingdom
Satirical magazines published in the United Kingdom
College humor magazines
Magazines established in 1924